Matthew James Lohr (born August 28, 1971) is an American politician. On January 15, 2022 Lohr was sworn in by Governor Glenn Youngkin as Virginia's 5th Secretary of Agriculture and Forestry. In this role, he will serve in the governor's cabinet and oversee the Virginia Department of Agriculture and Consumer Services, the Virginia Department of Forestry, and the Virginia Racing Commission. December 3, 2018 he was appointed by Secretary of Agriculture Sonny Perdue as the Chief of the Natural Resources Conservation Service, he served until January 20, 2021. Lohr served in the Virginia House of Delegates from 2006–2010, representing the 26th district in the Shenandoah Valley, made up of the city of Harrisonburg and part of Rockingham County.  From December 2013 until June 2017, Lohr worked for Farm Credit of the Virginias as director of the Knowledge Center.  In this position he facilitated the sharing of knowledge and resources for the betterment of all farmers.

Lohr is a member of the Republican Party.

While in the House, Lohr served on the committees of Agriculture, Chesapeake and Natural Resources; Counties, Cities and Towns; and Finance.  He also served as chairman of the Agriculture Subcommittee.  During his time in office, he was presented "Legislator of the Year" awards from the Virginia Career and Technical Education Association and the Virginia Economic Development Association.  In 2003 he won the American Farm Bureau "Excellence in Agriculture" Award as well as numerous farming and environmental stewardship honors.

Electoral history

Notes

External links 

1971 births
Living people
State cabinet secretaries of Virginia
United States Department of Agriculture officials
Republican Party members of the Virginia House of Delegates
Virginia Tech alumni
People from Harrisonburg, Virginia
21st-century American politicians
People from Broadway, Virginia